This is a list of the largest reservoirs, or man-made lakes, in the U.S. state of California. This includes those formed by raising the level of natural lakes, such as at Lake Tahoe. Most large reservoirs in California are owned by the federal Bureau of Reclamation and to a lesser extent the Army Corps of Engineers, many serving the Central Valley Project or State Water Project. Smaller ones are often run by county water agencies or irrigation and flood control districts.

Most large reservoirs in California are located in the central and northern portions of the state, especially along the large and flood-prone rivers of the Central Valley.

List

See also
List of dams and reservoirs in California
List of lakes in California
List of largest reservoirs in the United States
 Water in California
 California State Water Project

Notes

References

External links
Alphabetical index of California reservoirs
California Department of Water Resources website with current reservoir levels
List of largest reservoirs in California at worldatlas.com
Visualization of current and historical reservoir levels

Reservoirs of California
Reservoirs